Ibrahim Hyderi is a fishing village in the Malir District of Karachi, Pakistan. It's part of Bin Qasim Town,

There are several ethnic groups in Ibrahim Haidery including Katchi, [Sindhi ] 
People|Katchis]], [[Katchi
people|Sindhis]],Balochis, [[Brahui ]people|Brahuis]], Memons,. Over 85% of the population is Muslim. The population of Bin Qasim Town is estimated to be nearly one million.

Fish harbour 

Ibrahim Hyderi Fish Harbour or Ibrahim Hyderi Fish Point is a jetty for fishermen and their boats. The fish are processed and sent to markets and bazaars in Karachi.

See also 
 PAF Colony
 Bin Qasim Town
 Ali Akbar Shah Goth
 Shaheen Ropes

References

External links 
 Karachi Website .

Neighbourhoods of Karachi
Bin Qasim Town